Chaetothyrium is a genus of fungi in the family Chaetothyriaceae.

References 

Eurotiomycetes
Taxa named by Carlo Luigi Spegazzini
Eurotiomycetes genera